70/30 may refer to:
 70/30 Productions
 A form of insulin therapy, consisting of 70% intermediate-acting, and 30% fast-acting insulin.